Tonatia is a small genus of South and Central American phyllostomid bats.

Species
Greater round-eared bat, Tonatia bidens Spix, 1823
Stripe-headed round-eared bat, Tonatia saurophila Koopman & Williams, 1951

References

Phyllostomidae
Bat genera
Taxa named by John Edward Gray